Jacques Novi (born 18 July 1946), most commonly called Jacky Novi, is a French former professional footballer who played as a defender. He is the player with the eighth-most appearances in the French championship.

References

External links
 

1946 births
Living people
Association football defenders
French footballers
France international footballers
Ligue 1 players
Nîmes Olympique players
Olympique de Marseille players
Paris Saint-Germain F.C. players
RC Strasbourg Alsace players
French football managers
Rodez AF managers